The 49th World Cup season began on 25 October 2014, in Sölden, Austria, and concluded on 22 March 2015 at the World Cup finals in Meribel, France. The defending overall champions from the 2014 season - Marcel Hirscher and Anna Fenninger, both of Austria, defended their titles successfully. The season was  interrupted by the World Championships in February, in the United States at Vail/Beaver Creek, Colorado. Combined events were not awarded as a discipline trophy.

Calendar

Men

Ladies

Nation team event

Men's standings 

Overall 

Downhill 

Super-G 

Giant slalom

Slalom 

Alpine combined

Ladies' standings 

Overall

Downhill 

Super-G 
 

Giant slalom 

Slalom 

Alpine combined

Nations Cup 

Overall 

Men 

Ladies

Prize money 

Men 

Ladies

Footnotes

References

External links 
FIS-ski.com: Alpine skiing, FIS World Cup
FIS Alpine.com

 
FIS Alpine Ski World Cup
World Cup
World Cup